Adrian Mead is a British screenwriter, director and author.

Career
Prior to working in television, Mead had worked odd jobs, such as a hairdresser in New York and a nightclub bouncer. While studying in Edinburgh for a degree in criminal psychology, Mead got involved with student short films. He began making his own short films in the early 2000s, and gained his first television writing credit on Where the Heart Is, followed by series such as Paradise Heights, Waking the Dead and River City. In 2005, he directed and co-wrote his feature debut, Night People. It was developed and financed under the Scottish Screen/SMG New Found Film initiative.

He also worked as a director on children's television, such as Eve and Molly and Mack, as well as doing second unit on The Replacement and the fourth series of Shetland. He authored a screenwriting manual, Making it as a Screenwriter, in 2008, which focused on practical tools and steps towards working in the British industry.

Filmography

Television
 Where the Heart Is (2000-2001) - Writer
 Paradise Heights (2002) - Writer
 The Eustace Bros. (2003) - Writer
 Blue Dove (2004) - Writer
 Waking the Dead (2008) - Writer
 River City (2010) - Writer
 M.I. High (2014) - Director
 Eve (2015-2016) - Director
 Molly & Mack (2018-2019) - Lead director

Film
 Family (2002) - Director
 Hushtown (2004) - Director, writer 
 Night People (2005) Director, co-writer
 Killer (2012) - Director, writer 
 Misgivings (2016) - Director

References

External links
 Official Website
 

Living people
21st-century English male writers
British soap opera writers
British male screenwriters
English television writers
British television directors
British film directors
English soap opera writers
British male television writers
Screenwriting instructors
Year of birth missing (living people)
21st-century British screenwriters